Senator Bivins may refer to:

Teel Bivins (1947–2009), Texas State Senate
Tim Bivins (born 1951), Illinois State Senate